The Mazda K360 (Japanese: マツダ・K360) is a three-wheeled light truck made by Mazda. It first went on sale in 1959 in Japan.  Production ended in 1969. In total, 280,000 vehicles were produced. It was the replacement for the Mazda-Go.

The vehicle is 2.975 metres in length, 1.28 metres wide, 1.43 metres tall, weighs 485 kilograms, and has a top speed of 65 km/h.

References

External links

Photographs and specifications (in Japanese)

K360
Three-wheeled motor vehicles